Sartrouville is a railway station serving Sartrouville, a northwestern suburb of Paris, France. It is on the Paris–Le Havre railway.

See also
 List of stations of the Paris RER

External links

 

Réseau Express Régional stations
Railway stations in Yvelines
Sartrouville